Psilochorus imitatus is a species of cellar spider in the family Pholcidae. It is found in the United States.

References

Pholcidae
Articles created by Qbugbot
Spiders described in 1940